The Eurockéennes de Belfort are one of France's largest rock music festivals. The Eurockéennes, a play on words involving rock (rock music) and européennes (Europeans), is a festival based in a nature reserve beside Lac de Malsaucy Belfort.

About

History
1989 marked the first time round for the festival, when it went under the name Le Ballon - Territoire de musiques, named after the nearby Ballon d'Alsace. The festival was organised to take place on the Ballon d'Alsace, but the peninsula on the Malsaucy lake was chosen in the end, because it was easier to link by car, bus and even train. It was the brainchild of the Conseil général of the Territoire de Belfort, who wanted to dynamise their département with a big cultural event for its youths.

In 1990 the festival was renamed les Eurockéennes de Belfort.

Attendance:
 10,000 in 1989
 70,000 in 1993
 80,000 in 2002
 95,000 in 2004
 100,000 in 2006
 100,000 in 2008
 127,000 in 2013 (on 4 days)
 102,000 in 2015
 130,000 in 2017
 135,000 in 2018

Les Eurockéennes takes place on the peninsula of Lake Malsaucy, 10 kilometres from Belfort. A number of different stages are present – la Grande Scène, le Chapiteau, la Loggia and la Plage. Most of the time there are simultaneous concerts on different stages; altogether in 2005 there were about 70.

A campsite, 3 km from the main site, is the free temporary home to 15000 festival-goers, with a free shuttle bus running between the campsite and the entrance to the main area.

2020 and 2021 editions and COVID-19 pandemic 
It was announced on 13 April 2020 that the 2020 edition would be cancelled because of the ongoing COVID-19 pandemic.

Eurockeennes 2021 was cancelled as well.

Les tremplins

Tremplins (stepping stones) are organised to allow youth groups to get to know one another. These are organised in Alsace, Bourgogne, Franche-Comté (Doubs, Jura, Haute-Saône and Territoire de Belfort), Lorraine, Germany and Switzerland.

Billing

2012

 1995
 Alabama Shakes
 Amadou et Mariam featuring Bertrand Cantat
 Art District
 Busy P
 C2C
 Carbon Airways
 Cerebrall Ballzy
 Charlie Winston
 Chinese Man
 Christine
 Cie Transe Express
 Cypress Hill
 Die Antwoord
 Dionysos
 Django Django
 Dope D.O.D
 Dropkick Murphys
 Electric Guest
 Factory Floor
 Frànçois and The Atlas Mountains
 Gentleman
 Hank Williams III
 Hanni El Khatib
 Hathors
 Hollie Cook
 Hubert-Félix Thiéfaine
 Jack White
 Jesus Christ Fashion Barbe
 Justice
 Kavinsky
 Kindness
 Lana Del Rey
 Le Comte de Bouderbala
 Los Disidentes Del Sucio Motel
 Marie Madeleine
 Mastodon
 Miike Snow
 Miles Kane
 Murkage
 Näo
 Orelsan
 Poliça
 Refused
 Reggie Watts
 Sahab Koanda & Le Kokondo Zaz
 Sallie Ford & The Sound Outside
 Sebastian
 Set & Match
 Sgt Pokes
 Shaka Ponk
 Skream And Benga
 The Brian Jonestown Massacre
 The Buttshakers
 The Cure
 Thee Oh Sees
 The Kooks
 The Mars Volta
 Wiz Khalifa

2011

 Aaron
 And So I Watch You From Afar
 Anna Calvi
 Arcade Fire
 Arctic Monkeys
 Atari Teenage Riot
 Battles
 Beady Eye
 Beth Ditto
 Binary Audio Misfits
 Birdy Nam Nam
 Boys Noize
 Carte Blanche
 Cheers
 Crystal Castles
 Drums Are For Parades
 Funeral Party
 Gaëtan Roussel
 Hit By Moscow
 Honey For Petzi
 House of Pain
 Karkwa
 Katerine & New Burlesque
 Keziah Jones
 King Automatic
 Kyuss Lives!
 Les Hurlements d'Léo
 Les Savy Fav
 Mars Red Sky
 Medi
 Metronomy
 Mona
 Moriarty
 Motörhead
 Nasser
 Odd Future
 Padwriterz
 Paul Kalkbrenner
 Queens of the Stone Age
 Raphael Saadiq
 Staff Benda Bilili
 Stromae
 The Dø
 The Electric Suicide Club
 The Shoes
 The Ting Tings
 Tiken Jah Fakoly
 True Live
 Tryo
 Ullmann Kararocke
 Wu Lyf

2010

 Jay-Z
 LCD Soundsystem
 the xx
 The Hives
 Memphis Bleek
 The Black Keys
 The Specials
 Julian Casablancas
 The Dead Weather
 Missy Elliott
 Mika
 Fuck Buttons
 Chromeo
 Foals
 Gallows
 Hot Chip
 Health
 Broken Social Scene
 The Drums
 Bomba Estereo
 Charlotte Gainsbourg
 Vitalic
 Martina Topley-Bird
 Memory Tapes
 Massive Attack
 Patrick Watson
 Kasabian
 Airbourne
 Janelle Monáe
 Empire of the Sun
 Two Door Cinema Club
 Afrodizz
 The Bloody Beetroots
 Woven Hand
 BB Brunes
 Beast
 Omar Souleyman
 Suicidal Tendencies
 Infectious Grooves
 The Middle East

2009

 The Prodigy
 The Kills
 Mos Def
 Yeah Yeah Yeahs
 Cypress Hill
 Florence and the Machine
 Friendly Fires
 Emiliana Torrini
 King Khan and the Shrines
 Kanye West
 Peter Bjorn & John
 Kap Bambino
 Diplo
 Monotonix
 Friendly Fires
 La Roux
 Laurent Garnier
 Alela Diane
 Slipknot
 Rolo Tomassi
 Passion Pit
 Chapelier Fou
 Phoenix
 Peter Doherty
 Airbourne
 Sleepy Sun
 Noisettes
  Gojira
 Dananananaykroyd
 Crookers
 Olivia Ruiz
 Naïve New Beaters
 Tricky
 The Temper Trap

2008

 Cat Power
 N*E*R*D
 Babyshambles
 Vampire Weekend
 The Offspring
 The Mondrians
 CSS
 Sebastien Tellier
 MGMT
 Santogold
 Moby
 Seasick Steve
 Calvin Harris
 Massive Attack
 Biffy Clyro
 Gnarls Barkley
 dan Le Sac vs Scroobius Pip
 Lykke Li
 Soko
 The Gossip
 Yeasayer
 Girl Talk
 Battles
 Ben Harper
 Holy Fuck
 Comets on Fire
 Grinderman
 The Wombats
 Camille
 The Dø
 Cavalera Conspiracy
 dEUS
 The Blakes

2007

 Arcade Fire
 Wu-Tang Clan
 TV on the Radio
 Digitalism
 Queens of the Stone Age
 Cold War Kids
 I'm From Barcelona
 Deerhoof
 Marilyn Manson
 Juliette and the Licks
 Les Rita Mitsouko
 Klaxons
 Amy Winehouse
 Maxïmo Park
 Air
 65daysofstatic
 Justice
 Gogol Bordello
 Young Gods
 Bonde Do Role
 Editors
 Clipse
 Converge
 Peter Von Poehl
 Archie Bronson Outfit
 Punish Yourself
 Junior Senior
 Simian Mobile Disco
 The Good, the Bad & the Queen
 Bitty McLean

2006

 Depeche Mode
 Morrissey
 Daft Punk
 Deftones
 The Strokes
 Animal Collective
 Arctic Monkeys
 Damian Marley
 The Young Knives
 Muse
 Sigur Rós
 Archive
 Blackalicious
 Mogwai
 Dominique A
 Art Brut
 Gossip
 Two Gallants
 Uffie
 Gojira
 Anaïs
 Atmosphere
 Nonstop
 Polysics
 Poni Hoax
 Malajube
 Fancy
 Coldcut
 Infadels
 Philippe Katerine
 Spank Rock
 Apsci
 La Caution
 Spleen
 Nathan Fake
 Fat Freddys Drop
 Cult of Luna
 Islands
 Les Georges Leningrad
 We Are Wolves
 Ghislain Poirier
 Omnikrom
 Duchess Says
 Aberfeldy
 Giant Drag

2005

 Bloc Party
 Sonic Youth
 Interpol
 Bright Eyes
 The Chemical Brothers
 CocoRosie
 Eagles of Death Metal
 Electrelane
 The Killers
 Kraftwerk
 Le Tigre
 Common
 Émilie Simon
 The Go! Team
 Röyksopp
 Slum Village
 Jamie Lidell
 Raphael Saadiq
 Vitalic
 Andrew Bird
 Amon Tobin
 Balkan Beat Box
 Jean Grae
 Tom Ze
 Blumen
 Kaizers Orchestra
 Ken Boothe
 Konono Nº1
 Little Barrie
 Nine Inch Nails
 Queens of the Stone Age
 Saul Williams
 T. Raumschmiere
 Amadou & Mariam
 Bonnie 'Prince' Billy
 Cake
 Cali
 Dälek
 Eths
 Garbage
 Ghinzu
 KaS Product
 Mastodon
 Moodymann
 Morgan Heritage
 The National
 Tom Vek

2004

 PJ Harvey
 Pixies
 TV on the Radio
 Belle and Sebastian
 Slipknot
 The Rapture
 Groove Armada
 Blonde Redhead
 Zero7
 KoЯn
 Ben Kweller
 !!!
 Placebo
 An Albatross
 Scissor Sisters
 Luke
 No One Is Innocent
 Two Tone Club
 JR Ewing
 IAM
 Broken Social Scene
 Franz Ferdinand
 Matthieu Chedid
 Lyrics Born
 Lifesavas
 Capleton
 Antibalas Afrobeat Orchestra
 Mono
 A.S Dragon
 Herman Düne & Invites
 Daniel Darc
 Seeed
 Buck 65 and Band
 Youngblood Brass Band
 Alain Bashung
 RJD2
 Sludgefeast
 The Perceptionists
 Agoria
 X-Vision
 The Cat Empire
 Amp Fiddler
 The Dillinger Escape Plan
 Lust
 High Tone

2003

 Toots & the Maytals
 Radiohead
 The Rapture
 The Roots
 Peaches
 LCD Soundsystem
 The Streets
 Dave Gahan (in Depeche Mode)
 Goldfrapp
 Slayer
 2 Many Djs
 Nada Surf
 Underworld
 Massive Attack
 The Melvins
 Electric Six
 Death in Vegas
 Suicide
 The Datsuns
 Mickey 3D
 Stone Sour
 Console
 Nostromo
 Arto Lindsay
 Les Wampas
 Ellen Allien
 Mike Ladd
 Hexstatic
 AqME
 Hell Is for Heroes
 Tokyo Ska Paradise Orchestra
 La Rumeur
 Dionysos
 Tom McRae
 Tricky
 I Monster
 Fat Truckers
 Eiffel
 The Polyphonic Spree
 Zebda
 Tony Allen
 Jaga Jazzist
 Watcha
 Blackalicious
 Asian Dub Foundation
 Tomahawk

2002

 Muse
 Vitalic
 N*E*R*D
 Rival Schools
 The Chemical Brothers
 Travis
 The Notwist
 Antipop Consortium
 Buju Banton
 Pleymo
 Bulle
 The (International) Noise Conspiracy
 Sinclair
 New Bomb Turks
 Saïan Supa Crew
 The Bellrays
 Noir Désir
 Bilal
 Archive
 Soulfly
 Meï Teï Shô
 High Tone
 Alec Empire
 A
 Aston Villa
 Tarmac
 Ska-P
 Watcha
 Gomez
 Lofofora + invités
 Air
 Miro
 Burning Heads
 Hawksley Workman
 Michael Franti & Spearhead
 Trio Mocoto
 Sizzla
 Sainkho Namtchylak
 Rammstein
 Gotan Project

2001

 Iggy Pop
 Ben Harper
 Incubus
 Matmatah
 Yann Tiersen
 La Ruda Salska
 Tété
 Têtes Raides
 K's Choice
 Disiz la Peste
 Burning Spear
 Young Gods
 Tricky
 Anthony B
 Joseph Arthur
 Freestylers
 Nashville Pussy
 Innocent Criminals
 Amadou et Mariam
 Mass Hysteria
 K2R Riddim
 Fantômas

2000

 St Germain
 Moby
 The Cranberries
 Oasis
 Slayer
 Fu Manchu
 Muse
 Coldplay
 Nine Inch Nails
 Oomph
 Tryo
 Skirt
 Dionysos
 -M-
 Massilia Sound System
 Femi Kuti
 A Perfect Circle

1999

 Al Green
 Blondie
 Eagle-Eye Cherry
 Lenny Kravitz
 The Black Crowes
 Stereophonics
 Tricky
 Bloodhound Gang
 The Cardigans
 Marilyn Manson
 Matmatah
 Metallica
 Monster Magnet
 Placebo
 Skunk Anansie
 Hubert-Félix Thiéfaine
 Angra
 Cheb Mami
 Gus Gus
 Lofofora
 Mercury Rev
 P18
 Calexico
 Cree Summer
 Creed
 Everlast
 Masnada
 Mercyful Fate
 Polar
 Popa Chubby
 Rinocérose

1998

 The Prodigy
 Underworld
 Cornershop
 Iggy Pop
 Portishead
 Pulp
 Morcheeba
 Rammstein
 Sean Lennon
 Suicidal Tendencies
 Texas
 Faudel
 Heather Nova
 Jon Spencer Blues Explosion
 Louise Attaque
 NTM
 Asian Dub Foundation
 Divine Comedy
 Hotei
 Jean-Louis Aubert
 Passi
 Pigalle
 Automatics
 Awake
 Fonky Family
 Hare
 Jeremy
 Jim White
 K's Choice
 Tabula Rasa
 Tortoise

1997

 Simple Minds
 Radiohead
 Supergrass
 Smashing Pumpkins
 Chemical Brothers
 Placebo
 Suede
 Nada Surf
 Stereophonics
 Channel Zero
 Biohazard
 Live
 Melville
 Baby Bird
 No One Is Innocent
 Noir Désir
 Sloy
 16 Horsepower
 Silverchair
 Rollins Band
 Fédération française de fonck (FFF)

1996

 Beck
 David Bowie
 Patti Smith
 Foo Fighters ("We were opening up for David Bowie..." recalled Dave Grohl. "It didn't make any sense for me: a drummer pretending to be a singer; to stand in front of so many people and try to entertain them all. Like, I'm not Freddie Mercury. And then David Bowie goes out and lifts a fucking finger and people go fucking berserk. I didn't understand it at all."
 Lou Reed
 Nick Cave
 Red Hot Chili Peppers
 Sepultura
 Skunk Anansie
 Ash
 The Bluetones
 Dog Eat Dog
 Frank Black
 Fun Lovin' Criminals
 Ministry
 Miossec
 NTM
 Raggasonic
 Silmarils
 The Bates
 Dominique A
 Ginkgo
 Loudblast
 Red Cardell

1995

 Blur
 The Cure
 Supergrass
 Jamiroquai
 Public Enemy
 Jeff Buckley
 Oasis
 Paul Weller
 The Roots
 Sheryl Crow
 Ben Harper
 Body Count
 Dave Matthews Band
 dEUS
 Renaud
 Terence Trent D'Arby
 Ange
 Arno
 Page and Plant
 Dreadzone
 Earthling
 Edwyn Collins
 Paradise Lost
 Senser
 Spearhead
 18th Dye
 Alliance Ethnik
 Burning Heads
 Dag
 Gérald De Palmas
 Silverchair
 Ultimatum
 Tortoise

1994

 Björk
 ZZ Top
 Khaled
 The Pretenders
 Rage Against the Machine
 Chaka Demus & Pliers
 The Posies
 Rita Mitsouko
 Blind Fish
 Burma Shave
 Gary Clail
 Grant Lee Buffalo
 I Am
 Les Thugs
 Morphine
 Spin Doctors
 Swell
 Therapy?
 Fabulous Trobadors
 Helmet
 No One Is Innocent
 Nyah Fearties
 Rachid Taha
 Sons of the Desert
 Radiohead

1993

 Sonic Youth
 Ziggy Marley
 Lenny Kravitz
 The Lemonheads
 The Frank and Walters
 Black Crowes
 Jean-Louis Aubert
 Living Colour
 Midnight Oil
 Noir Désir
 Willy Deville
 Calvin Russell
 Chris Isaak
 Faith No More
 Galliano
 Jesus Jones
 MC Solaar
 Massilia Sound System
 Mau Mau
 Rattlesnakes
 Roadrunners

1992

 Bob Dylan
 Bryan Adams
 James Brown
 Lou Reed
 Moe Tucker
 Morrissey
 Manic Street Preachers
 Ned's Atomic Dustbin
 Rufus Thomas
 Wedding Present
 Alpha Blondy
 
 Charlélie Couture
 Fishbone
 The Fools
 Jade
 Les Négresses Vertes
 Little Nemo
 Mike Rimbaud
 Milena
 Sapho
 Sunset
 Urban Dance Squad
 Wilko Johnson
 Betty Boop
 Résistance

1991

 Vopli Vidopliassova
 Pixies
 The House of Love
 INXS
 The Charlatans
 The Wailers
 Joe Jackson
 Mano Negra
 Axel Bauer
 James
 John Cale
 Pigalle

Vopli Vidopliassova's set was released on LP and CD a year later as Abo abo.

1990

 Alain Bashung
 Arno
 Jean-Louis Aubert
 Kheops
 Kunsertu
 Miss B. Haven
 Nuit d'Octobre
 Okeztra Luna
 Park Café
 Rictus
 Roe
 Santana
 Texas
 The Essence
 Top Model
 Trio Bulgarka
 Trovante
 Trypes

Due to a storm, many performances had to be cut out, including Davy Spillane Band - Hubert-Félix Thiéfaine - Les Garçons Bouchers - P.V.O. - Stephan Eicher - Stéphane Riva).

1989

 Catherine Lara
 Charlélie Couture
 Elvis Costello
 Jacques Higelin, Maurane
 Ange
 Les Garçons Bouchers
 Litfiba
 Nina Hagen
 Noir Désir
 Animal Grotesque
 Chihuahua
 E 127
 Enigmatic Légume
 Gamine
 Girls Without Curls
 Jade
 Jean-Louis Mahjun
 Les Cyclistes
 Les Infidèles
 Les Kidnappés De La Pleine Lune
 Les Raviolets
 Les Zamants
 The Blech
 The Renegades
 Untel Untel
 Anna Prucnal
 Christian Blondel
 Colette Magny
 Elmer Food Beat
 Emma Zita
 Fabienne Pralon
 Les Lolitas
 Mama Bea Tiekelski
 Pascal Mathieu
 Ravel Chapuis
 Véronique Gain
 Zaniboni

References

External links
 Site officiel des Eurockéennes de Belfort 
 Le Tremplin des Eurockéennes 
 Critiques sur le site W-Fenec.org 
 Historique des Eurockéennes de 1989 à 2005 
 Critique de l'édition 2005 sur krinein musique 
 The 2008 edition by one of the official photographers 

Territoire de Belfort
Rock festivals in France
Heavy metal festivals in France
Tourist attractions in the Territoire de Belfort
Music festivals established in 1989